Jonesville is the largest town in Catahoula Parish, Louisiana, United States, at the confluence of the Ouachita, Tensas, and Little rivers. The three rivers become the Black River at Jonesville.

The Jonesville population was 2,265 at the 2010 census. 

The four rivers which intersect near Jonesville are all subject to flooding. There are surrounding soybean and cotton fields. A few plantation houses still stand, built during the former slavery-based, planter-dominated economy. The population fell significantly when a textile mill shut down in the late 1980s.

History

Jonesville was once the site of the Troyville Earthworks; built by ancient Native Americans who occupied the site from 100 BCE to 700 CE. Once home to between 9-11 mounds, most have been leveled to make way for the construction of the modern town; including the Great Mound which was once  in height. It was the tallest mound in Louisiana and the second tallest in the United States after Monks Mound at Cahokia in Illinois. It was destroyed for bridge approach fill in 1931. The site is the type site for the Troyville culture of the lower Ouachita and Tensas River valleys.

Geography
Jonesville's  northern border is formed by the Little River, while its eastern border is formed by the Black River. Concordia Parish is to the east across the Black River.

U.S. Route 84 passes through the town as 4th Street and leads east  to Ferriday and west  to Jena. Louisiana State Highway 124 leads north  to Harrisonburg, the Catahoula Parish seat, and south  to its end in Argo.

Climate
The climate in the area is characterized by hot, humid summers and generally mild-to-cool winters. According to the Köppen Climate Classification system, Jonesville has a humid subtropical climate, abbreviated "Cfa" on climate maps.

Demographics

2020 census

As of the 2020 United States census, there were 1,728 people, 703 households, and 386 families residing in the town.

2000 census
As of the census of 2000, there were 2,469 people, 916 households, and 620 families residing in the town. The racial makeup of the town was 39.77% White, 59.17% African American, 0.28% Native American, 0.12% Asian, and 0.65% from two or more races. Hispanic or Latino of any race were 0.97% of the population.

There were 916 households, out of which 36.0% had children under the age of 18 living with them, 34.7% were married couples living together, 28.2% had a female householder with no husband present, and 32.3% were non-families. 28.7% of all households were made up of individuals, and 11.6% had someone living alone who was 65 years of age or older. The average household size was 2.57 and the average family size was 3.15.

In the town, the population was spread out, with 29.5% under the age of 18, 9.3% from 18 to 24, 26.2% from 25 to 44, 18.7% from 45 to 64, and 16.3% who were 65 years of age or older. The median age was 35 years. For every 100 females, there were 84.7 males. For every 100 females age 18 and over, there were 74.5 males.

The median income for a household in the town was $18,622, and the median income for a family was $23,462. Males had a median income of $21,139 versus $18,482 for females. The per capita income for the town was $10,173. About 31.1% of families and 36.8% of the population were below the poverty line, including 49.7% of those under age 18 and 25.5% of those age 65 or over.

Notable people
William B. Atkins, former member of both houses of the Louisiana legislature; Jonesville resident
Charles A. Marvin, district attorney of Bossier and Webster parishes (1971-1975) and judge of the Louisiana Circuit Court of Appeal for the Second District in Shreveport (1975-1999), born in Jonesville in 1929<ref></ref
Tommy McLain, singer-songwriter, musician and Swamp-Pop star, born in Jonesville, March 15, 1940.
Chris Shivers, champion rodeo performer, resides with his family on Jonesville
Jack C. Watson, lawyer and judge, born in Jonesville

References

External links
 Jonesville Progress Community Progress Site for Jonesville, LA
 DiscoverCatahoula.com Community Website for Catahoula Parish, LA

Louisiana populated places on the Ouachita River
Towns in Catahoula Parish, Louisiana
Towns in Louisiana